Lois Virginia Curfman McInnes is an American applied mathematician who works as a senior computational scientist at Argonne National Laboratory, where she works on the numerical solution of nonlinear partial differential equations for scientific applications.

Education and career
McInnes graduated in 1988 from Muhlenberg College, with a double major in mathematics and physics. She completed her doctorate in applied mathematics in 1993 at the University of Virginia; her dissertation, Solution of Convective-Diffusive Flow Problems with Newton-Like Methods, was supervised by James McDonough Ortega. She was chair of the SIAM Activity Group on Computational Science and Engineering for 2015–2016. In 2021, she will join the SIAM council as a Member-at-Large. In 2022, she was elected Chair of the Society for Industrial and Applied Mathematics Activity Group on Supercomputing (SIAM SIAG/SC).

Recognition
She won the Ernest Orlando Lawrence Award of the DOE Office of Science in 2011.
She and her co-developers of the Portable, Extensible Toolkit for Scientific Computation were also honored in 2015 with the SIAM/ACM Prize in Computational Science and Engineering.
She was elected as a fellow of the Society for Industrial and Applied Mathematics (SIAM) in 2017, "for contributions to scalable numerical algorithms and software libraries for solving large-scale scientific and engineering problems".

References

External links

Year of birth missing (living people)
Living people
20th-century American mathematicians
21st-century American mathematicians
American women mathematicians
Muhlenberg College alumni
University of Virginia alumni
Fellows of the Society for Industrial and Applied Mathematics
Argonne National Laboratory people
20th-century women mathematicians
21st-century women mathematicians
20th-century American women
21st-century American women